The 2017–18 Carolina Hurricanes season was the 39th season for the National Hockey League (NHL) franchise that was established on June 22, 1979 (following seven seasons of play in the World Hockey Association), and 20th season since the franchise relocated from Hartford to start the 1997–98 NHL season. The Canes failed to make the playoffs for the ninth consecutive season.

Standings

Schedule and results

Preseason
The preseason schedule was released on June 8, 2017.

Regular season
The regular season schedule was announced on June 22, 2017.

Player statistics
Final
Skaters

Goaltenders

Transactions
The Hurricanes have been involved in the following transactions during the 2017–18 season.

Trades

Notes
 The Vegas Golden Knights will select Connor Brickley in the 2017 NHL Expansion Draft.

Free agents acquired

Free agents lost

Claimed via waivers

Lost via waivers

Lost via retirement

Player signings

Draft picks

Below are the Carolina Hurricanes' selections at the 2017 NHL Entry Draft, which was held on June 23 and 24, 2017 at the United Center in Chicago.

Draft notes:
 The New York Rangers' second-round pick will go to the Carolina Hurricanes as the result of a trade on February 28, 2016 that sent Eric Staal to New York in exchange for Aleksi Saarela, a second-round pick in 2016 and this pick.
 The New Jersey Devils' third-round pick will go to the Carolina Hurricanes as the result of a trade on March 5, 2014 that sent Tuomo Ruutu to New Jersey in exchange for Andrei Loktionov and this pick (being conditional at the time of the trade). The condition and date of conversion are unknown.

References

Carolina Hurricanes seasons
Carolina Hurricanes
2017 in sports in North Carolina
2018 in sports in North Carolina